The World Cat Congress (WCC) is an international confederation of the biggest international federations and national associations in the cat fancy.

Purpose
The purpose of the WCC is to promote better understanding and co-operation among the world's various cat associations in matters of mutual interest and concern. Following this, regular meetings took place and in 1999 a charter was drawn up and in 2001 a constitution was agreed.

The WCC emphasises the importance of international co-operation between cat organisations and to discuss topics such as veterinary matters, microchipping, breed presentations, cat legislation and feline welfare affecting all cat lovers, from the pedigree breeder to pet owners. An annual meeting is held, treating proposals of the 9 bodies affiliated.

WCC's aims include:
 Creating cat shows and coordination of show dates
 Promoting cat health 
 Consulting on legislation regarding cats
 Producing and distributing educational material about cats
 Recognition and registration of pedigrees and breeders

History
In 1994 the Italian cat club Associazione Nazionale Felina Italiana organised a cat club seminar during which a meeting was held between the visiting heads of world cat organisations. Out of this grew the idea of the World Cat Congress.

WCC Members
 Australian Cat Federation (ACF) *
 Cat Fanciers' Association (CFA) *
 Co-ordinating Cat Council of Australia (CCC of A)
 Fédération Internationale Féline (FIFe) *
 Governing Council of the Cat Fancy, United Kingdom (GCCF)
 New Zealand Cat Fancy (NZCF)
 Southern Africa Cat Council (SACC)
 The International Cat Association (TICA) *
 World Cat Federation - (WCF) *

*Founding members.

References

External links
 WCC - World Cat Congress

Organizations established in 1994